The following species in the genus Salix are recognised by Plants of the World Online:

Salix × aberrans A.Camus & E.G.Camus
Salix abscondita Lacksch.
Salix acmophylla Boiss.
Salix acutifolia Willd. – violet willow
Salix aegyptiaca L.
Salix aeruginosa E.Carranza
Salix alatavica Kar. ex Stschegl.
Salix alaxensis (Andersson) Coville – Alaska willow
Salix alba L. – white willow
Salix alexii-skvortzovii A.P.Khokhr.
Salix × algista C.K.Schneid.
Salix alpina Scop. – alpine willow
Salix × altobracensis H.J.Coste
Salix × ambigua Ehrh.
Salix × amoena Fernald
Salix × ampherista C.K.Schneid.
Salix amplexicaulis Bory & Chaub.
Salix amygdaloides Andersson – peachleaf willow
Salix anatolica Ziel. & D.Tomasz.
Salix × angusensis Rech.f.
Salix annulifera C.Marquand & Airy Shaw
Salix anticecrenata Kimura
Salix apennina A.K.Skvortsov
Salix apoda Trautv.
Salix appendiculata Vill.
Salix × arakiana Koidz.
Salix arbuscula L. – mountain willow
Salix arbusculoides Andersson – littletree willow
Salix arbutifolia Pall.
Salix arctica Pall. – Arctic willow
Salix arctophila Cockerell
Salix × argusii B.Boivin
Salix argyracea E.L.Wolf
Salix argyrocarpa Andersson
Salix arizonica Dorn
Salix armeno-rossica A.K.Skvortsov
Salix arrigonii Brullo
Salix × aschersoniana Seemen
Salix athabascensis Raup
Salix atopantha C.K.Schneid.
Salix atrocinerea Brot. – grey willow
Salix aurita L. – eared willow
Salix × austriaca Host
Salix austrotibetica N.Chao
Salix babylonica L. – Babylon willow, Peking willow
Salix baileyi C.K.Schneid.
Salix balansae Seemen
Salix balfouriana C.K.Schneid.
Salix × balfourii E.F.Linton
Salix ballii Dorn
Salix bangongensis Z.Wang & C.F.Fang
Salix barclayi Andersson – Barclay's willow
Salix barrattiana Hook. – Barratt's willow
Salix bebbiana Sarg. – beaked willow
Salix × beckiana Beck
Salix berberifolia Pall.
 Salix bhutanensis
Salix bicolor Ehrh. ex Willd.
Salix bikouensis Y.L.Chou
Salix blakii Goerz
Salix blinii H.Lév.
Salix × boettcheri Seemen
Salix bonplandiana Kunth – Bonpland willow, ahuejote
Salix boothii Dorn – Booth's willow
Salix borealis Fr.
Salix boseensis N.Chao
Salix × boulayi F.Gérard
Salix brachycarpa Nutt. – barren-ground willow
Salix brachypoda (Trautv. & C.A.Mey.) Kom.
Salix × brachypurpurea B.Boivin
Salix breviserrata Flod.
Salix breweri Bebb – Brewer's willow
Salix brutia Brullo & G.Spamp.
Salix × buseri Favrat
Salix cacuminis A.K.Skvortsov
Salix caesia Vill.
Salix calcicola Fernald & Wiegand – limestone willow
Salix × calliantha Jos.Kern.
Salix calyculata Hook.f. ex Andersson
Salix cana M.Martens & Galeotti
Salix candida Flüggé ex Willd. – sage willow
Salix × canescens Willd.
Salix caprea L. – goat willow
Salix × capreola A.Kern. ex Andersson
Salix capusii Franch.
Salix cardiophylla Trautv. & C.A.Mey.
Salix carmanica Bornm.
Salix caroliniana Michx. – coastal plain willow
Salix cascadensis Cockerell
Salix caspica Pall.
Salix cathayana Diels
Salix caucasica Andersson
Salix cavaleriei H.Lév.
Salix × cernua E.F.Linton
Salix chaenomeloides Kimura
Salix chamissonis Andersson
Salix characta C.K.Schneid.
Salix × charrieri Chass.
Salix chevalieri Seemen
Salix cheilophila C.K.Schneid.
Salix chienii Cheng
Salix chikungensis C.K.Schneid.
Salix chilensis Molina
Salix chlorolepis Fernald
Salix cinerea L. – grey sallow
Salix clathrata Hand.-Mazz.
Salix × coerulescens Döll
Salix coggygria Hand.-Mazz.
Salix columbiana Argus – Columbia River willow
Salix coluteoides Mirb.
Salix commutata Bebb – undergreen willow
Salix × confinis A.Camus & E.G.Camus
Salix × conifera Wangenh.
Salix contortiapiculata P.I Mao & W.Z.Li
Salix cordata Michx. – heartleaf, sand dune willow
Salix × cottetii A.Kern.
Salix crataegifolia Bertol.
Salix × cremnophila Kimura
Salix cupularis Rehder
Salix daguanensis P.I Mao & P.X. He
Salix daliensis  C.F.Fang & S.D.Zhao
Salix daltoniana Andersson
Salix dalungensis Z.Wang & P.Y.Fu
Salix daphnoides Vill.
Salix delavayana Hand.-Mazz.
Salix delnortensis C.K.Schneid. – del Norte willow
Salix denticulata Andersson
Salix × devestita Arv.-Touv.
Salix × dichroa Döll
Salix dibapha C.K.Schneid.
Salix × digenea Jos.Kern.
Salix discolor Muhl. – American willow, pussy willow
Salix disperma Roxb. ex D.Don
Salix dissa C.K.Schneid.
Salix divergentistyla C.F.Fang
Salix divaricata Pall.
Salix doii Hayata
Salix dolichostachya Flod.
Salix donggouxianica C.F.Fang
Salix × doniana Sm.
Salix driophila C.K.Schneid.
Salix drummondiana Barratt ex Hook. – Drummond's willow
Salix dshugdshurica A.K.Skvortsov
Salix × dutillyi Lepage
Salix eastwoodiae Cockerell ex A.Heller – Eastwood's willow
Salix × ehrhartiana Sm.
Salix eleagnos Scop.
Salix × erdingeri A.Kern.
Salix × eriocataphylla Kimura
Salix × eriocataphylloides Kimura
Salix eriocephala Michx. – heartleaf willow
Salix erioclada H. Lév. & Vaniot
Salix eriostachya Wall. ex Andersson
Salix ernestii C.K.Schneid.
Salix erythrocarpa Kom.
Salix × erythroclados Simonk.
Salix × euerata Kimura
Salix × euryadenia Ausserd. ex A.Kern.
Salix euxina I.V.Belyaeva
Salix excelsa S.G.Gmel.
Salix exigua Nutt. – sandbar willow
Salix famelica (C.R.Ball) Argus
Salix fargesii Burkill
Salix farriae C.R.Ball
Salix fedtschenkoi Goerz
Salix × finnmarchica Willd.
Salix flabellaris Andersson
Salix floccosa Burkill
Salix floridana Chapm.
Salix × flueggeana Willd.
Salix foetida Schleich. ex DC.
Salix × forbesiana Druce
Salix × forbyana Sm.
Salix × fragilis L.
Salix × friesiana Andersson
Salix × fruticosa Döll
Salix fruticulosa Andersson
Salix fulvopubescens Hayata
Salix fuscescens Andersson – Alaska bog willow
Salix futura Seemen
Salix × gaspensis C.K.Schneid.
Salix geyeriana Andersson
Salix gilgiana Seemen
Salix × gillotii A.Camus & E.G.Camus
Salix glabra Scop.
Salix × glatfelterii C.K.Schneid.
Salix glauca L. – northern willow
Salix glaucosericea  Flod.
Salix gmelinii Pall.
Salix gonggashanica C.F.Fang & A.K.Skvortsov
Salix gooddingii C.R.Ball – Goodding willow
Salix gracilior (Siuzew) Nakai
Salix gracilistyla Miq.
Salix × grahamii Borrer ex Baker
Salix × grayi C.K.Schneid.
Salix guinieri Chass. & Goerz
Salix gussonei Brullo & G.Spamp.
Salix × hapala Kimura
Salix hartwegii Benth.
Salix hastata L.
Salix × hatusimae Kimura
Salix × hayatana Kimura
Salix × hebecarpa (Fernald) Fernald
Salix hegetschweileri Heer
Salix helvetica Vill. – Swiss willow
Salix herbacea L. – dwarf willow
Salix × hermaphroditica L.
Salix × hiraoana Kimura
Salix × hirsutophylla A.Camus & E.G.Camus
Salix × hirtii Strähler
Salix × hisauchiana Koidz.
Salix hookeriana Barratt ex Hook. – Hooker's willow
Salix × hostii A.Kern.
Salix × hudsonensis C.K.Schneid.
Salix hukaoana Kimura
Salix humboldtiana – Chile willow
Salix humilis Marshall – upland willow
Salix × ikenoana Kimura
Salix iliensis Regel
Salix integra Thunb.
Salix interior Rowlee
Salix × intermedia Host
Salix × inticensis Huter
Salix ionica Brullo, F.Scelsi & G.Spamp.
Salix irrorata Andersson
Salix × iwahisana Kimura
Salix jaliscana M.E.Jones
Salix × jamesensis Lepage
Salix japonica Thunb.
Salix × japopina Kimura
Salix jejuna Fernald – barrens willow
Salix jenisseensis (F.Schmidt) Flod.
Salix jepsonii C.K.Schneid. – Jepson's willow
Salix × jesupii Fernald
Salix juparica Goerz ex Rehder & Kobuski
Salix jurtzevii A.K.Skvortsov
Salix kalarica (A.K.Skvortsov) Vorosch.
Salix × kamikotica Kimura
Salix kangensis Nakai
Salix karelinii Turcz. ex Stschegl.
Salix × kawamurana Kimura
Salix khokhriakovii A.K.Skvortsov
Salix kirilowiana Stschegl.
Salix kitaibeliana Willd.
Salix kochiana Trautv.
Salix koeieana A.K.Skvortsov
Salix × koidzumii Kimura
Salix × koiei Kimura
Salix koriyanagi Kimura ex Goerz
Salix × krausei Andersson
Salix krylovii E.L.Wolf
Salix × kudoi Kimura
Salix kusanoi (Hayata) C.K.Schneid.
Salix kuznetzowii Laksch. ex Goerz
Salix laevigata Bebb – red willow
Salix laggeri Wimm.
Salix × lambertiana Sm.
Salix lanata L. – woolly willow
Salix lapponum L. – downy willow
Salix lasiandra Benth.
Salix lasiolepis Benth. – arroyo willow
Salix × latifolia J.Forbes
Salix × laurentiana Fernald
Salix × laurina Sm.
Salix ledebouriana Trautv.
Salix ledermannii Seemen
Salix × leiophylla A.Camus & E.G.Camus
Salix lemmonii Bebb – Lemmon's willow
Salix × leucopithecia Kimura
Salix ligulifolia (C.R.Ball) C.R.Ball ex C.K.Schneid. – strapleaf willow
Salix lindleyana Wall. ex Andersson
Salix × lintonii A.Camus & E.G.Camus
Salix × litigiosa A.Camus & E.G.Camus
Salix × lochsiensis D.J.Tennant
Salix longiflora Wall. ex Andersson
Salix longistamina Z.Wang & P.Y.Fu
Salix lucida Muhl. – shining willow
Salix luctuosa H.Lév.
Salix × ludibunda A.Camus & E.G.Camus
Salix × ludificans F.B.White
Salix ludlowiana A.K.Skvortsov
Salix lutea Nutt. – yellow willow
Salix × lyonensis D.J.Tennant
Salix maccalliana Rowlee
Salix magnifica Hemsl.
Salix × margaretae Seemen
Salix × margarita F.B.White
Salix × mariana Wol.
Salix × maritima Hartig
Salix martiana Leyb.
Salix × matsumurae Seemen
Salix × meikleana D.J.Tennant
Salix melanopsis Nutt. – dusky willow
Salix mesnyi Hance
Salix mexicana Seemen
Salix × meyeriana Rostk. ex Willd.
Salix michelsonii Goerz ex Nasarow
Salix microphylla Schltdl. & Cham.
Salix microstachya Turcz. ex Trautv.
Salix × microstemon Kimura
Salix mielichhoferi Saut.
Salix miyabeana Seemen
Salix × mollissima Hoffm. ex Elwert
Salix monochroma C.R.Ball
Salix × montana Host
Salix monticola Bebb
Salix moupinensis Franch.
Salix mucronata Thunb.
Salix muliensis Goerz
Salix × multinervis Döll
Salix myricoides Muhl.
Salix myrsinifolia Salisb. – dark-leaved willow
Salix myrsinites L. – whortle-leaved willow
Salix myrtillacea Andersson
Salix myrtillifolia Andersson
Salix myrtilloides L. – swamp willow
Salix × myrtoides Döll
Salix nakamurana Koidz.
Salix nasarovii A.K.Skvortsov
Salix × nasuensis Kimura
Salix × neuburgensis Erdner
Salix niedzwieckii Goerz
Salix nigra Marshall – black willow
Salix niphoclada Rydb.
Salix nipponica Franch. & Sav.
Salix nivalis Hook.
Salix × notha Andersson
Salix nummularia Andersson
Salix nuristanica A.K.Skvortsov
Salix obscura Andersson
Salix × obtusifolia Willd.
Salix × oleifolia Vill.
Salix olgae Regel
Salix × onychiophylla Andersson
Salix opsimantha C.K.Schneid.
Salix oreinoma C.K.Schneid.
Salix oreophila Hook.f. ex Andersson
Salix orestera C.K.Schneid. – Sierra willow, gray-leafed Sierra willow
Salix oritrepha C.K.Schneid.
Salix oropotamica Brullo, F.Scelsi & G.Spamp.
Salix ovalifolia Trautv.
Salix pantosericea Goerz
Salix paradoxa Kunth
Salix paraplesia C.K.Schneid.
Salix × peasei Fernald
Salix pedicellaris Pursh – bog willow
Salix pedicellata Desf.
Salix × pedionoma Kimura
Salix × pedunculata Fernald
Salix pellita (Andersson) Bebb
Salix × peloritana Prestandr. ex Tineo
Salix × pendulina Wender.
Salix pentandra L. – bay willow
Salix pentandrifolia Sennikov
Salix × permixta Jeanne Webb
Salix × perthensis Druce
Salix petiolaris Sm. – slender willow
Salix petrophila Rydb.
Salix × phaeophylla Andersson
Salix phlebophylla Andersson
Salix phylicifolia L. – tea-leaved willow
Salix pierotii Miq.
Salix × pithoensis Rouy
Salix planifolia Pursh – planeleaf willow
Salix plocotricha C.K.Schneid.
Salix polaris Wahlenb. – polar willow
Salix prolixa Andersson – MacKenzie's willow
Salix pseudocalyculata Kimura
Salix pseudodepressa A.K.Skvortsov
Salix × pseudodoniana Rouy
Salix × pseudoglauca Andersson
Salix pseudomedemii E.L.Wolf
Salix pseudomonticola C.R.Ball
Salix pseudomyrsinites Andersson
Salix × pseudopaludicola Kimura
Salix pseudopentandra (Flod.) Flod.
Salix pseudospissa Goerz ex Rehder & Kobuski
Salix pseudowallichiana Goerz ex Rehder & Kobuski
Salix psilostigma Andersson
Salix pulchra Cham.
Salix × punctata Wahlenb.
Salix purpurea L. – purple willow
Salix pycnostachya Andersson
Salix pyrenaica Gouan
Salix pyrifolia Andersson – balsam willow
Salix pyrolifolia Ledeb.
Salix qinghaiensis Y.L.Chou
Salix × quercifolia Sennen ex Goerz
Salix radinostachya C.K.Schneid.
Salix raupii Argus
Salix rectijulis Ledeb. ex Trautv.
Salix recurvigemmata A.K.Skvortsov
Salix rehderiana C.K.Schneid.
Salix × reichardtii A.Kern.
Salix reinii Franch. & Sav. ex Seemen
Salix repens L. – creeping willow
Salix reptans Rupr.
Salix reticulata L. – net-leaved willow
Salix retusa L.
Salix × retusoides Jos.Kern.
Salix rhamnifolia Pall.
Salix rhododendroides C.Wang & C.Y.Yu
Salix richardsonii Hook. – possible synonym of Salix lanata
Salix riskindii M.C.Johnst.
Salix rockii Goerz ex Rehder & Kobuski
Salix rorida Laksch.
Salix rosmarinifolia L. – rosemary-leaved willow
Salix rotundifolia Trautv.
Salix × rubella Bebb ex Rowlee & Wiegand
Salix × rubra Huds.
Salix × rubriformis Tourlet
Salix × rugulosa Andersson
Salix rupifraga Koidz.
Salix × sadleri Syme
Salix sajanensis Nasarow
Salix salviifolia Brot.
Salix salwinensis Hand.-Mazz. ex Enander
Salix saposhnikovii A.K.Skvortsov
Salix saxatilis Turcz. ex Ledeb.
Salix × saxetana F.B.White
Salix × schaburovii I.V.Belyaeva
Salix × schatilowii R.I.Schröd. ex Dippel
Salix × schatzii Sagorski
Salix × schneideri B.Boivin
Salix × scholzii Rouy
Salix × schumanniana Seemen
Salix schwerinii E.L.Wolf
Salix sclerophylla Andersson
Salix scouleriana Barratt ex Hook. – Scouler's willow
Salix × secerneta F.B.White
Salix × semimyrtilloides A.Camus & E.G.Camus
Salix × seminigricans A.Camus & E.G.Camus
Salix × semireticulata F.B.White
Salix × semiviminalis E.L.Wolf
Salix × sendaica Kimura
Salix × sepulcralis group – hybrid willows
Salix × sepulcralis 'Chrysocoma' – golden weeping willow
Salix sericea Marshall – silky willow
Salix sericocarpa Andersson
Salix × seringeana Gaudin
Salix serissima (L.H.Bailey ex Arthur) Fernald – autumn willow
Salix serpillifolia Scop.
Salix × sesquitertia F.B.White
Salix sessilifolia Nutt.
Salix setchelliana C.R.Ball
Salix shiraii Seemen
Salix × sibyllina F.B.White
Salix sieboldiana Blume
Salix × sigemitui Kimura
Salix sikkimensis Andersson
Salix silesiaca Willd.
Salix silicicola Raup
Salix × simulatrix F.B.White
Salix × sirakawensis Kimura
Salix sitchensis Sanson ex Bong. – Sitka willow
Salix × sobrina F.B.White
Salix songarica Andersson
Salix spathulifolia Seemen
Salix × speciosa Host
Salix sphaeronymphe Goerz
Salix sphenophylla A.K.Skvortsov
Salix staintoniana A.K.Skvortsov
Salix starkeana Willd.
Salix stolonifera Coville
Salix stomatophora Flod.
Salix × straehleri Seemen
Salix × strepida J.Forbes
Salix × subglabra A.Kern.
Salix subopposita Miq.
Salix × subsericea Döll
Salix suchowensis W.C.Cheng
Salix × sugayana Kimura
Salix sumiyosensis Kimura
Salix taiwanalpina Kimura
Salix × tambaensis Koidz. & Araki
Salix × taoensis Goerz ex Rehder & Kobuski
Salix taraikensis Kimura
Salix tarraconensis Pau
Salix taxifolia Kunth – yewleaf willow
Salix × taylorii Rech.f.
Salix tengchongensis C.F.Fang
Salix tenuijulis Ledeb.
Salix × teplouchovii R.I.Schröd. ex Wolkenst.
Salix × tetrapla Walk.
Salix tetrasperma Roxb.
Salix × thaymasta Kimura
Salix thomsoniana Andersson
Salix thorelii Dode
Salix thurberi Rowlee
Salix tianschanica Regel
Salix tibetica Goerz ex Rehder & Kobuski
Salix × tomentella A.Camus & E.G.Camus
Salix tonkinensis Seemen
Salix tracyi C.R.Ball
Salix triandra L. – almond willow
Salix triandroides W.P.Fang
Salix tschujensis (Bolsch.) Baikov
Salix tschuktschorum A.K.Skvortsov
Salix turanica Nasarow
Salix turczaninowii (Laksch.)
Salix × turfosa A.Camus & E.G.Camus
Salix turnorii Raup
Salix × turumatii Kimura
Salix tweedyi (Bebb) C.R.Ball
Salix tyrrellii Raup
Salix tyrrhenica Brullo, F.Scelsi & Spamp.
Salix udensis (Wimm.) Trautv. & C.A.Mey.
Salix uralicola I.V.Belyaeva
Salix uva-ursi Pursh – bearberry willow
Salix variegata Franch.
Salix vestita Pursh – silky willow
Salix × viciosorum Sennen & Pau
Salix viminalis L. – common osier
Salix vinogradovii A.K.Skvortsov
Salix vulpina Andersson
Salix × waghornei Rydb.
Salix waldsteiniana Willd.
Salix × wiegandii Fernald
Salix wilhelmsiana M.Bieb.
Salix × wimmeri A.Kern.
Salix wolfii Bebb
Salix × woloszczakii Zalewski
Salix × wrightii Andersson
Salix wuxuhaiensis N.Chao
Salix × wyomingensis Rydb.
Salix xanthicola K.I.Chr.
Salix zangica N.Chao

References

Salix
Salix